The following are the members of the Dewan Undangan Negeri or state assemblies, elected in the 1995 state election and by-elections. Also included is the list of the Sabah and Sarawak state assembly members who were elected in 1994 and 1996 respectively.

Perlis

Kedah

Elected members

Seating arrangement

Kelantan

Terengganu

Penang

Perak

Pahang

Selangor

Negeri Sembilan

Malacca

Johor

Sabah

1994–1999

Sarawak

1996–2001

Notes

References

Abdullah, Z. G., Adnan, H. N., & Lee, K. H. (1997). Malaysia, tokoh dulu dan kini = Malaysian personalities, past and present. Kuala Lumpur, Malaysia: Penerbit Universiti Malaya.
Anzagain Sdn. Bhd. (2004). Almanak keputusan pilihan raya umum: Parlimen & Dewan Undangan Negeri, 1959-1999. Shah Alam, Selangor: Anzagain. 
Chin, U.-H. (1996). Chinese politics in Sarawak: A study of the Sarawak United People's Party. Kuala Lumpur: Oxford University Press.
Faisal, S. H. (2012). Domination and Contestation: Muslim Bumiputera Politics in Sarawak. Institute of Southeast Asian Studies.
Gomez, E. T. (1996). The 1995 Malaysian general elections: A report and commentary. Singapore: Institute of Southeast Asian Studies.

1995 elections in Malaysia